Béla Bognár (1927–2008) was an artist, art writer, publisher and art dealer working in the Los Angeles area in the late 1960s.

In 1970 Béla founded the West Coast Art Center, along with peers Mr. and Mrs. Robert Robles and art writers Jeanne Good and Irene Bognár. The West Coast Art Center was dedicated to the promotion of, and education in, the burgeoning field of contemporary art in the Southwest United States. The directors of the West Coast Art Center, inspired by Bela's experience ('67-1970) as editor of Art Calendar Magazine for LACMA, planned to publish Arts West, a magazine to feature articles on contemporary art and include listings of cultural events.

Béla Bognár placed as finalist in the 1963 contest for the Sir John Sulman Prize at the Art Gallery of New South Wales located in Sydney, Australia, with his submission, a contemporary painting titled "I Am...".

References

Hungarian artists
Hungarian emigrants to the United States
1927 births
2008 deaths